Nine Black Poppies is an EP by the Mountain Goats.

Track listing

References

External links 
Complete lyrics to the album

1995 EPs
The Mountain Goats EPs